Arseneau is a French surname.  Notable people with the surname include:

Joseph Brant Arseneau (born 1967), inventor
Maxime Arseneau (born 1949), Canadian radio host, educator and politician

See also

Arseneault
Arsenault
Arceneaux

French-language surnames